Pack Train is a 1953 American Western film directed by George Archainbaud and starring Gene Autry and Gail Davis.

Plot

Cast
 Gene Autry as Gene Autry  
 Champion as Gene's Horse  
 Gail Davis as Jennifer Coleman  
 Kenne Duncan as Ross McLain  
 Sheila Ryan as Lola Riker  
 Tom London as Dan Coleman  
 Smiley Burnette as Smiley Burnette

References

Bibliography
 Rowan, Terry. The American Western A Complete Film Guide. 2013.

External links
 

1953 films
1953 Western (genre) films
American Western (genre) films
Films directed by George Archainbaud
Columbia Pictures films
American black-and-white films
1950s English-language films
1950s American films